Weberbauerocereus cuzcoensis is a species of Weberbauerocereus from Peru.

References

External links
 
 

cuzcoensis
Flora of Peru
Plants described in 1968